Tīnūži Parish is an administrative unit of Ogre Municipality, Latvia. It was created in 2010 from the countryside territory of Ikšķile town. At the beginning of 2014, the population of the parish was 2446. The administrative center is Tīnūži village.

Towns, villages and settlements of Tīnūži parish 
 Ceplīši
 Dobelnieki
 Elkšņi
 Kalnāji
 Tīnūži
 Turkalne

References

External links 
 

Parishes of Latvia
Ogre Municipality
Vidzeme